The End of the World is a 1916 Danish science fiction drama film directed by August Blom and written by Otto Rung, starring Olaf Fønss and Ebba Thomsen. The film depicts a worldwide catastrophe when an errant comet passes by Earth and causes natural disasters and social unrest. Blom and his crew created special effects for the comet disaster using showers of fiery sparks and shrouds of smoke. The film attracted a huge audience because of fears generated during the passing of Halley's comet six years earlier, as well as the ongoing turbulence and unrest of World War I. The film is also known as The Flaming Sword. It was restored by the Danish Film Institute and released on DVD in 2006.

Cast
Olaf Fønss as Frank Stoll - Mine Owner
Carl Lauritzen as Mineformand / Mine Forman West
Ebba Thomsen as Dina West
Johanne Fritz-Petersen as Edith West
Thorleif Lund as Minearbejder / Worker Flint
Alf Blütecher as Styrmand / Ship's Mate Reymers
Frederik Jacobsen as Den vandrende Prædikant / The Wandering Preacher
K. Zimmerman as Professor Wissmann
Moritz Beilawski
Erik Holberg

References

External links
 
 The End of the World on YouTube
 

1916 films
1910s science fiction drama films
Apocalyptic films
Danish black-and-white films
Danish silent films
Danish science fiction drama films
Fiction about comets
Films directed by August Blom
Films about impact events
1916 drama films
Comets in film
Silent science fiction drama films